Princess Nakrang, also known as Princess Anjeong Sukui or Lady Sinran (신란궁부인, 神鸞宮夫人) was a Goryeo princess as the first daughter of King Taejo and Queen Sinmyeong who became the wife of King Gyeongsun of Silla. As the oldest, Princess Nakrang became the first Goryeo Princess (born from queen).

Family
Father: Taejo of Goryeo (31 January 877 – 4 July 943) (고려 태조)
Grandfather: Sejo of Goryeo (고려 세조)
Grandmother: Queen Wisuk (위숙왕후)
Mother: Queen Sinmyeong (신명왕후)
Grandfather: Yu Geung-dal (유긍달)
Husband: Gyeongsun of Silla (신라 경순왕; 896–978)
Son: Kim Eun-yeol, Prince Daean (김은열 대안군)
Son: Kim Seok, Prince Uiseong (김석 의성군)
Son: Kim Geon, Prince Gangreung (김건 강릉군)
Son: Kim Seon, Prince Eonyang (김선 언양군)
Son: Kim Chu, Prince Samcheok (김추 삼척군)
Daughter: Unnamed princess
Daughter: Lady Sinran of the Gyeongju Kim clan (신란궁부인 김씨)

In popular culture
Portrayed by Lee Kan-hee in the 2002–2003 KBS TV Series The Dawn of the Empire.

References

http://terms.naver.com/entry.nhn?docId=532554&cid=46620&categoryId=46620&mobile

Year of birth unknown
10th-century Korean people
Goryeo princesses
Royal consorts of Silla
10th-century Korean women